Oh My Ghost may refer to:

 "Oh My Ghost? (Watashi ga Akuryō ni Natte mo)", a 2011 song by Shiritsu Ebisu Chugaku
 Oh My Ghost (South Korean TV series), a 2015 television series
 Oh My Ghost (Thai TV series), a 2018 television series
 Oh! My Ghost, a 2021 South Korean film
 Oh My Ghost (film), a 2022 Indian film